František Janda (10 September 1886 – 2 March 1956) was a Czechoslovak architect and urban planner, in which capacity he authored many regulation designs. Janda studied under the tutelage of Jan Kotěra at the Academy of Arts, Architecture and Design in Prague. Along with pianist and composer Václav Štěpán he founded the Arts Forum, for which he designed and in 1925 finished construction of his Cooperative Arts Forum building in Prague's Malá Strana district. For the remainder of his life Janda lived in this building. In 1960, four years after his death, the property was confiscated by the communist government. Janda's wife, however, was allowed to continue living there until her death. His most famous building is probably the functionalist Waldekova Vila in Hradec Králové (1937).

Works
 Winter spa in Poděbrady (1912)
 30-room art nouveau guest house at Rieger's Square, Poděbrady spa (1912)
 Regulation plans for the cities of Mladá Boleslav and Poděbrady (1912) and the spa village Brestovičky
 Mladá Boleslav courthouse
 Building societies in Mnichovo Hradiště, Holice, Bakov nad Jizerou, Nová Paka and Mnichovo Hradiště
 Arts Forum in Prague (1925)
 (with Č. Vořech) Theatre Na Prádle, Prague-Malá Strana (1924–26)
 District Union building in Nové Strašecí (1928–1930)
 Water towers in Kolín (1930; Janda replaced Jan Vladimír Hráský, author of the original 1928 project), Podebrady, Jaroměř, Bělá pod Bezdězem and Pečky
 Merkur restaurant and cafe  in Jablonec nad Nisou (1930)
 Office buildings, including erstwhile municipal HQ, in Sušice (1925–1932)
 Waldekova Vila in Hradec Králové (1937)

References

External links

 Photo portrait of Janda (c. 1928)

1886 births
1956 deaths
People from Nymburk District
People from the Kingdom of Bohemia
Czechoslovak architects
Czechoslovak urban planners
Academy of Arts, Architecture and Design in Prague alumni